Curcuma alismatifolia, Siam tulip or summer tulip is a tropical plant native to Laos, northern Thailand, and Cambodia. Despite its name, it is not related to the tulip, but to the various ginger species such as turmeric. It can grow as an indoor plant, and is also sold as a cut flower.

One of the most famous wild fields of Siam tulips is in Pa Hin Ngam National Park in Chaiyaphum Province, Thailand.

Malvidin 3-rutinoside is a pigment responsible for bract color in C. alismatifolia.

References 

alismatifolia
Flora of Cambodia
Flora of Laos
Flora of Thailand
Plants described in 1903